The 2022 NCAA Division II Football Championship Game is a college football game played on December 17, 2022, at McKinney ISD Stadium in McKinney, Texas. The game determined the national champion of NCAA Division II for the 2022 season. The game was scheduled to begin at 12:00 p.m. CST and was broadcast by ESPNU.

The game featured the two finalists of the 24-team playoff bracket, which began on November 19, 2022. The top-seeded Ferris State Bulldogs from the Great Lakes Intercollegiate Athletic Conference (GLIAC) defeated the second seed Colorado Mines Orediggers from the Rocky Mountain Athletic Conference (RMAC), 41–14. The win gave the Ferris football program its second national championship.

Teams
The participants of the 2022 NCAA Division II Football Championship Game were the finalists of the 2022 Division II Playoffs, which began on November 19 with four 7-team brackets to determine super region champions, who then qualified for the national semifinals.

National semifinals
Super region champions were reseeded 1 to 4 for the national semifinals.

Game summary

Statistics

References

Championship Game
NCAA Division II Football Championship Games
Colorado Mines Orediggers football games
Ferris State Bulldogs football games
American football competitions in Texas
NCAA Division II Football Championship Game
NCAA Division II Football Championship Game
McKinney, Texas
Sports in Collin County, Texas